The rhomboid wrasse, Cirrhilabrus rhomboidalis, is a species of wrasse endemic to the Marshall Islands, where it is only known from Kwajalein Atoll.

References

rhomboid wrasse
Taxa named by John Ernest Randall
Fish described in 1988